The 2009 Monterey Sports Car Championships presented by Patrón was the tenth and final round of the 2009 American Le Mans Series season.  It took place at Mazda Raceway Laguna Seca, Monterey, California on October 11, 2009.  The race was won by the Acura of de Ferran Motorsports, driven by Simon Pagenaud and retiring driver Gil de Ferran, which wore a tribute livery based on Jim Hall's Chaparrals.  Adrian Fernández and Luis Díaz won the LMP2 category in the Fernández Racing Acura while only six tenths of a second behind the overall winning de Ferran car.  The GT2 class was won by the #45 Flying Lizard Motorsports Porsche after contact with the #3 Corvette Racing while approaching the finish line on the final lap.  Guy Cosmo and John Baker of Orbit Racing won their first race in the ALMS Challenge category after the Velox Motorsport entry was disqualified.

Qualifying result
Pole position winners in each class are marked in bold.

Race result
Class winners are marked in bold. Cars failing to complete 70% of winner's distance are marked as Not Classified (NC).

References

Monterey Sports Car Championships
Monterey Sports Car Championships
Monterey Sports Car